Accused is a 2005 Danish drama film, directed by Jacob Thuesen. It is about a couple, Henrik and Nina Christofferson whose happiness was shattered when their 14-year-old daughter Stine accused her father of molesting her. The film showed at the 55th Berlin International Film Festival in February 2005.

Plot
Henrik and Nina Christofferson seem to be an ordinary family living happily. However, their difficult 14-year-old daughter, Stine, has a habit of telling lies in class. When Stine accuses her father of sexual abuse, and is readily believed by social workers, the family is thrown into crisis. Did Henrik do it? When Stine prepares to return home, the ugly side of family life is exposed.

Cast
Troels Lyby - Henrik 
Sofie Gråbøl - Nina 
 -  Pede 
Louise Mieritz -  Pernille 
Kirstine Rosenkrands Mikkelsen -  Stine
Søren Malling - Forsvarer (solicitor)

References

External links

2005 films
European Film Awards winners (films)
Danish drama films
2000s Danish-language films
Incest in film
2005 drama films